Manos: The Hands of Fate is a 1966 American independent no-budget supernatural folk horror film written, directed, produced by Harold P. Warren. It stars Tom Neyman, John Reynolds, Diane Mahree and Harold P. Warren. The film follows a family getting lost during their vacation road trip through the Texas desert and becoming stranded at the lodge of a polygynous pagan cult led by the Master who decides their fate.

Warren was an insurance and fertilizer salesman from El Paso, Texas, who made the film as a result of a bet with screenwriter Stirling Silliphant. Most of the remaining cast and crew had little or no background in filmmaking. The theatrical debut was poorly received, playing only at the Capri Theater in El Paso and some drive-ins around West Texas and New Mexico.

Manos remained obscure until featured in a 1993 episode of Mystery Science Theater 3000, a television series based around mocking B movies. This developed its cult reputation as one of the worst films ever made. The film has been criticized for continuous deficiencies in editing, continuity, audiovisual synchronization, pacing, and acting, as well as several inexplicable and disconnected scenes, such as a nameless couple repeatedly shown kissing in a distant car and the Master's wives breaking into catfights. Its MST3K appearance resulted in several DVD releases of the original film and three of the MST3K episode. The original 16 mm workprint was discovered in California in 2011, from which a new, remastered version of the film was released on Blu-ray by Synapse Films on October 13, 2015.

The film was followed by a prequel, Manos: The Rise of Torgo (2018), and a sequel, Manos Returns (2018).

Plot

While on vacation near El Paso, Texas, Michael, Margaret, their young daughter Debbie, and their dog, Peppy, drive through the desert in search of the Valley Lodge. Margaret insists they are lost, and Michael claims they are not. They are stopped by a local deputy for a broken taillight, and released because Michael asks him for mercy on their "first vacation". After long shots of driving through farmland and the desert, intercut with scenes of two unidentified teenagers kissing in a car and being caught by the deputies, the family finally reaches a house. The bizarre, satyr-like Torgo, is caretaker "while the Master is away". Michael and Margaret apprehensively ask Torgo for directions to the Valley Lodge, which Torgo denies knowing. Frustrated, Michael asks Torgo to let him and his family stay the night, despite objections from both Torgo and Margaret.

Inside the house, Michael and Margaret find a disturbing painting of the Mastera dark, malevolent-looking man and a black dog with glowing eyes. An ominous howl frightens Margaret, and Peppy breaks away from Debbie and runs outside. Michael investigates with a flashlight and revolver from his car, and he finds Peppy lying dead on the ground. Michael buries the dog in the desert and goes back to the house. Meanwhile, Torgo reveals his sudden attraction to Margaret and wants to keep her, defying the Master's desire to marry her. Margaret threatens to tell Michael of Torgo's advances, but Torgo convinces her not to say anything by promising to protect her. Michael returns and is unable to start the car. Torgo tells them there is no phone in the house, so the family reluctantly decides to stay the night.

Torgo secretly watches Margaret changing her clothes. Michael and Margaret find Debbie is gone and go to look for her. Debbie returns, holding the leash of the big black dog from the painting. Following Debbie, Michael and Margaret stumble upon the Master and his wives, sleeping around a blazing fire. The wives are dressed in diaphanous nightgowns, the Master in a robe with two red hands on it. Margaret and Debbie run back to the house to get their things and escape. As Michael runs behind them, Torgo appears and uses a stick to knock him out and then ties him to a pole. The Master awakens and summons his wives, telling them that Michael must be sacrificed to the deity Manos, and that Margaret and Debbie will become his new wives. He leaves.

The other wives argue with each other about whether Debbie should become a wife or be sacrificed as well. This turns into a catfight, where the wives tumble around in the dirt. The Master returns and breaks up the fight, and he decides to sacrifice Torgo and his first wife instead. Meanwhile, Michael wakes up and unties himself, going back to the house to collect Margaret and Debbie. The family leaves the house and runs off into the desert to escape. The Master summons Torgo and hypnotizes him, ordering the wives to kill him. Two of the wives attack Torgo, and he falls to the ground, apparently dead. However, he regains consciousness and stands up. The Master severs and burns Torgo's left hand. Torgo runs off into the darkness with his stump of a wrist in flames, and the Master sacrifices his first wife.

As Michael, Margaret and Debbie run through the desert, Margaret falls and says she can't go any farther. A rattlesnake appears in front of them and Michael shoots it, the noise attracting the attention of the deputies, who assume the noises came from Mexico and leave it at that. Margaret convinces Michael to return to the house, as the cult would never think to look for them there. They go back and find the Master and his dog waiting for them. The Master steps slowly towards them, and Michael fires his gun, to no effect.

The film then cuts to another pair of travelers, two women starting their vacation and driving through a rainstorm, searching for shelter. When they find the Master's house, the entranced Michael greets them, telling them "I take care of the place while The Master is away." Margaret and Debbie have become wives of the Master, and all are asleep.

Cast

Harold P. Warren as Michael
John Reynolds as Torgo 
Diane Mahree as Margaret
Jackey Neyman as Debbie
Tom Neyman as The Master
Stephanie Nielson, Sherry Proctor, Robin Redd, Jay Hall, Bettie Burns, and Lelaine Hansard as the Master's wives
Bernie Rosenblum as Teenage boy
Joyce Molleur as Teenage girl
William Bryan Jennings and George Cavender as Cops
Pat Coburn as Girl in convertible

History

Production

Warren was very active in the theater scene in El Paso, Texas, and he once appeared as a walk-on for the television series Route 66, where he met screenwriter Stirling Silliphant. While chatting with Silliphant in a local coffee shop, Warren claimed that it was not difficult to make a horror film, and he bet Silliphant that he could make an entire film on his own. After placing the bet, Warren began the first outline of his script on a napkin, right inside the coffee shop.

Warren financed it with a substantial but insufficient amount of cash, . He hired a group of actors from a local theater, many of whom he had worked with before, and a modeling agency. Instead of any wages, Warren promised the cast and crew a share of profit.

In mid-1966, it was filmed with the working titles The Lodge of Sins and Fingers of Fate. It was shot mainly on the ranch of Colbert Coldwell, a lawyer who shared an office floor with Warren and who later became a judge in El Paso County. Most equipment was rented, so Warren hurriedly maximized the number of shots before the rental deadline. The 16 mm Bell & Howell camera is wound by hand with up to 32 seconds of footage, creating many unresolved editing problems. Rather than using location sync sound recording, all sound effects and dialogue were overdubbed in post-production by few people, including Warren, Tom Neyman, Reynolds, Jennings, and Warren's wife, Norma. Later during production, Warren renamed the film Manos: The Hands of Fate. Warren's small crew became so bemused by his amateurishness and irascibility that they derisively called the film Mangos: The Cans of Fruit behind his back.

During filming, Warren said that presenting Diane Mahree as the Texas Beauty Queen would generate good publicity for his movie. He signed her to a regional West Texas beauty pageant that would lead to Miss Texas and then to the Miss America pageant, but he neglected to tell her about it until she was accepted as an entrant. She complied and appeared onstage as a finalist. She later asserted that Warren urged her to remove her top for filming the window-peeping scene where Torgo observes her before declaring his love but, when she refused, he quickly backpedaled by claiming the suggestion was a test. Warren contracted with a modeling agency to provide the actresses who would play the Master's wives, including Joyce Molleur. She broke her foot early in production, so Warren retained her by rewriting the script to include a young couple kissing in a car on the side of the road, who are seemingly unconnected to the plot.

Warren shot night-for-night scenes, because many of the cast and crew also held day jobs. In many of the night scenes, the lights attracted swarms of moths in view of the camera. In the scene in which the police investigate Mike's gunfire, the lights could cover only a few feet forward, so the police stood there to feign a search and leave without any scenery or a panning shot.

Post-production efforts were minimal, though Warren promised crew members that any problems in the film would be fixed in later editing. For example, the clapperboard is momentarily visible. The entire nine-minute opening sequence, which consists of the main characters driving around looking for their hotel with minimal dialogue or plot, was the result of such neglect. Warren had likely intended to include opening credits over these shots, but either forgot or lacked the post-production budget.

John Reynolds, who played Torgo, committed suicide by shooting himself in the head with a shotgun on October 16, 1966, one month before the premiere. He was 25 years old and this was his only film appearance.

Release

The film premiered at the Capri Theater in Warren's hometown of El Paso, Texas on November 15, 1966, as a benefit for the local cerebral palsy fund. Warren rented a searchlight and paid for the cast to be delivered by limousine to enhance the Hollywood feel. The single limousine delivered one group, then drove around the block for another. Jackey Neyman-Jones, the seven year old who played Debbie, wept in disappointment at the premiere, particularly when hearing a woman's dubbed voice instead of her own. Mahree laughed throughout the screening at the film's ridiculousness.

Following the premiere, Warren thought Manos was the worst film ever made, but was proud of it, and he suggested that its audio might be re-dubbed into a passable comedy. The film was briefly distributed by Emerson Film Enterprises, with a brief theatrical run at the Capri Theater, and at various drive-in theaters in West Texas and New Mexico, including Las Cruces. The only compensation was Jackey Neyman's bicycle and her family dog's 50 pounds of dog food. Official box office figures are unknown, if they ever existed. Warren won his bet against Stirling Silliphant, proving that he was capable of creating an entire film.

The majority of the cast and crew never appeared in another film, though Mahree had a successful modeling career as Diane Adelson. Warren pitched another script he had written called Wild Desert Bikers, and then pitched its novelization, but with the failure of Manos, there was no interest.

Obscurity
Following few local screenings, Manos was almost entirely forgotten. When Jackey Neyman attended the University of California, Berkeley, her friends could not find a copy. A 1981 newspaper article by cinematographer Bob Guidry's ex-wife Pat Ellis Taylor reports the film may have appeared on a local television station and that it was "listed at the bottom of a page in a film catalogue for rent for $20". The film re-surfaced through a 16 mm print, presumably from this television package, which was introduced into the home video collecting market by a number of public domain film suppliers. One of these suppliers was ultimately the one that offered the film to Comedy Central. It was in a box of films sent to Frank Conniff in 1992, when he chose Manos as one of the films to be shown on Mystery Science Theater 3000.

Reception
The day after premiere, Betty Pierce, the film reviewer of the El Paso Herald-Post described it as a "brave experiment". She criticized some elements, such as the "hero" Torgo being "massaged to death" by the Master's wives and Margaret's claim of "it's getting dark" with a bright midday sun.

In 2005, Dan Neil of the Los Angeles Times explained the film's appeal: "After screening Manos for probably the 10th time, I've concluded it has to do with intimacy. Because it is such a pure slice of Warren's brain – he wrote, directed, produced and starred, and brooked no collaboration – Manos amounts to the man's cinematically transfigured subconscious." Manos buff Bobby Thompson said, "It's like a train wreck; you just can't take your eyes off it."

On review aggregator website Rotten Tomatoes, the film has an approval rating of 0% based on 16 reviews, with an average rating of 2.56/10. The book Hollywood's Most Wanted lists Manos as the #2 in the list of "The Worst Movies Ever Made", following Plan 9 from Outer Space. Entertainment Weekly proclaimed Manos "The Worst Movie Ever Made". The scene in which the seven-year-old Debbie becomes a wife of the Master, played by her real father, was included in a list of "The Most Disgusting Things We've Ever Seen" by the Mystery Science Theater 3000 crew.

For several years, the film was the lowest-rated movie on IMDb. As of September 2022, it ranks as the second lowest movie of all time on the site.

Legacy

Mystery Science Theater 3000 and RiffTrax

On January 30, 1993, the film was featured on the fourth season finale of the Comedy Central series Mystery Science Theater 3000, a show about a crew held captive in outer space by two mad scientists, and forced to watch bad movies. Manos was far worse than the usual fare, with the long uneventful drive used by the hosts to sarcastically repeat its title numerous times, in lieu of any action to heckle. The host robots eventually sobbed at the film defeating even their attempts at making it interesting. The mad scientists apologized and admitted the film was abysmal beyond their limits for torture. Torgo made a cameo in later episodes.

Selection of Manos for the show is credited to Frank Conniff, who also played TV's Frank. Conniff was generally in charge of pre-screening and selecting films sent to them by Comedy Central, the show's network at the time, and Manos was a random tape that he had pulled from a recent batch they had been sent. He felt the movie "seemed like it was maybe a crime against humanity, but you couldn’t be sure" and "has an atmosphere, a vibe" that made it appropriate for the show. The Manos episode has been described as one of the best of the MST3K series by Entertainment Weekly and CraveOnline, and the MST3K episode is credited with bringing to light the otherwise obscure film, even though it led to the film being considered one of the worst films made at user polls at the Internet Movie Database. Kevin Murphy later declared, "I hate this movie. I think I hate this movie more than any other film we ever did at RiffTrax or Mystery Science Theater. Even more than the Coleman Francis movies. There's something about this movie that just makes my skin crawl." During a Q&A session at the 2008 San Diego Comic-Con International, a question was put to the cast and writers of MST3K about any film they passed on that was worse than Manos, and many cited the film Child Bride.

Manos has also been riffed on by RiffTrax, a later project of MST3K alumni Mike Nelson, Kevin Murphy and Bill Corbett, during a live show on August 16, 2012, a live event that was simulcast in film theaters across the United States. While Nelson and Murphy were part of the cast when MST3K riffed on Manos, neither their fellow RiffTrax star Bill Corbett nor their writers were involved in the original episode; the riffing was all new jokes, using a cleaner print of the original Manos, allowing them to joke about things not obvious in the original television episode.

Cult following

The MST3K episode featuring the film was released on DVD in 2001, and in the Mystery Science Theater 3000 Essentials collection in 2004.

Four comedy stage adaptations of the film have been made. The first was given in Portland, Oregon in early 2006. The second, a musical titled Manos: Rock Opera of Fate, was launched in October 2007. The third, a puppet musical titled Manos – The Hands of Felt, was performed by Puppet This in Seattle in April 2011. After raising funds with a Kickstarter campaign in May 2013, Manos – The Hands of Felt was performed again in Seattle by Vox Fabuli Puppets in August 2013 and filmed for DVD release. The fourth was in Portland, Oregon in April 2013.

In March 2015, the murderers on the Elementary episode "T-Bone And The Iceman" used the physical features of Torgo (portrayed by John Reynolds) to compose a fake facial composite to get the NYPD off their trail. It worked until they were caught, due to the character of Dr. Joan Watson having recognized Torgo's features from the film. The film's editor, James Sullivan, is the namesake of one of the characters in the episode.

Restoration
In 2011, the original 16mm workprint of Manos: The Hands of Fate was discovered by Ben Solovey, a Florida State film school graduate, in a collection of 16 mm films. Solovey announced his intention to preserve and restore Manos for a Blu-ray release. His Kickstarter campaign raised $48,000, nearly five times the initial goal. A 90% finished print was premiered at the El Paso Plaza Theatre, near the original premiere in 1966. The new restoration premiered on Blu-ray on October 13, 2015, with an unrestored version ("Grindhouse") as one of the bonus features.

Copyright dispute 
In general, any work first published in the United States before March 1989 required a copyright notice, or the work was not copyrighted.  Manos: The Hands of Fate is in the public domain because director Harold Warren failed to include a copyright notice in the film. When news broke of Solovey's restoration, the son of Harold Warren, Joe Warren, started exploring the possibility that the film was not in the public domain, seeking to prevent others from profiting from his father's work. Warren discovered in 2013 that the script had been copyrighted and registered in the Library of Congress, and he believes that this copyright also applies to the film. No precedent exists for this case so the legal status of the film is uncertain. Solovey applied copyright on his restored version, an action that Warren believes is unenforceable, though has not sought any legal action against Solovey. Warren obtained pending publication of a trademark on the phrase Manos: The Hands of Fate, which could have impacted the various fanworks if the United States Patent and Trademark Office finalized approval. However, the trademark filing has since been abandoned as of December 6, 2018, for a "failure to respond or late response".

Home video releases
Shout! Factory released a special edition with both the MST3K and uncut versions called Manos y Manos. A DVD of the original was published by Alpha Video, which also released original versions of other MST3K films such as Teenagers from Outer Space and Eegah.

Sequels

Manos: The Search for Valley Lodge
In 2010, writer and director Rupert Talbot Munch, Sr. began work on Manos: The Search for Valley Lodge. Tom Neyman (in a cameo reprising his role as the Master), his daughter Jackey Neyman-Jones (reprising her role as Debbie), Diane Mahree (reprising the role of Margaret), and Bernie Rosenblum (who played a teenage boy in the original film) were involved in initial filming. Others engaged to appear included World Wrestling Entertainment star Gene Snitsky, former WWE diva and Playboy centerfold Maria Kanellis, and UFC fighter Ryan "Big Deal" Jimmo. Munch was to play Torgo.

In 2013, Neyman-Jones left the project after disagreements with Munch, and by the end of 2014, the project was reportedly canceled.

Manos: The Rise of Torgo
In 2013, a project began for a prequel titled Manos: The Rise of Torgo. David Roy (producer of the 2014 film Cheeseballs) was announced as the writer and director, and cast members were to include Neyman-Jones (playing Manos, the evil deity). It was released on Amazon Prime streaming in 2018.

Manos Returns

Jackey Neyman-Jones, who played Debbie in the original film, launched a Kickstarter campaign in February 2016 to make a sequel titled Manos Returns. According to Neyman-Jones, the sequel was not to be a recreation of Manos but instead a "tongue-in-cheek" setting within the Manos storyline; Neyman-Jones described the planned product as being both funny and scary, similar to Cabin in the Woods or Abbott and Costello Meet Frankenstein.

The Kickstarter goal of $24,000 was reached on February 24, 2016. It stars Neyman-Jones, reprising her role as Debbie, her father Tom Neyman, reprising his role as the Master, and Diane Mahree reprising her role as Margaret. Neyman-Jones and director Tonjia Atomic shot the film in western Oregon in the summer of 2016. The film had its world premiere screening at Crypticon Seattle on May 4, 2018. Manos Returns was published on Amazon Prime in May 2020.

Video game

A video game based on the film for iOS was released in 2012 by FreakZone Games. A Microsoft Windows port and an Android port were later released.

See also
 List of American films of 1966
 List of films considered the worst
 Z movie

References

External links

 
 
 
 Jackey Neyman-Jones' blog, in which she shares some of her stories about the making of the film
 
 The complete official soundtrack on Bandcamp

1966 films
1966 horror films
American supernatural horror films
American independent films
Culture of El Paso, Texas
1960s English-language films
Films set in Texas
Films shot in El Paso, Texas
Religious horror films
Polygamy in fiction
Films about pedophilia
Folk horror films
Articles containing video clips
Films about neopaganism
Films about cults
1966 directorial debut films
1966 independent films
1960s rediscovered films
Rediscovered American films
American exploitation films
1960s American films